Ashok B. Hinchigeri is an Indian judge. He is a Justice of Karnataka High Court.

References

Judges of the Karnataka High Court
20th-century Indian judges
Living people
Year of birth missing (living people)
Place of birth missing (living people)